The Battle of Palmito Ranch, also known as the Battle of Palmito Hill, is considered by some criteria as the final battle of the American Civil War. It was fought May 12 and 13, 1865, on the banks of the Rio Grande east of Brownsville, Texas, and a few miles from the seaport of Los Brazos de Santiago, at the southern tip of Texas. The battle took place more than a month after the general surrender of Confederate forces to Union forces at Appomattox Court House, which had since been communicated to both commanders at Palmito, and in the intervening weeks the Confederacy had collapsed entirely, so it could also be classified as a postwar action.

Union and Confederate forces in southern Texas had been observing an unofficial truce since the beginning of 1865, but Union Colonel Theodore H. Barrett, newly assigned to command an all-black unit and never having been involved in combat, ordered an attack on a Confederate camp near Fort Brown for unknown reasons. The Union attackers captured a few prisoners, but the following day the attack was repulsed near Palmito Ranch by Colonel John Salmon Ford, and the battle resulted in a Confederate victory. Union forces were surprised by artillery said to have been supplied by the French Army garrison occupying the up-river Mexican town of Matamoros.

Casualty estimates are not dependable, but Union Private John J. Williams of the 34th Indiana Infantry Regiment is believed to have been the last man killed during the engagement. He could then arguably be reckoned as the last man killed in the war.

Background

After July 27, 1864, the Union Army withdrew most of the 6,500 troops deployed to the lower Rio Grande Valley, including Brownsville, which they had occupied since November 2, 1863. The Confederates were determined to protect their remaining ports, which were essential for cotton sales to Europe and the importation of supplies. The Mexicans across the border tended to side with the Confederates because of the lucrative cotton export trade. Beginning in early 1865, the rival armies in south Texas honored a gentlemen's agreement, as they saw no point in further hostilities between them.

Union Major General Lew Wallace proposed a negotiated end of hostilities in Texas to Confederate Brigadier General James E. Slaughter, and met with Slaughter and his subordinate Colonel Ford at Port Isabel on March 11–12, 1865. Despite Slaughter's and Ford's agreement that combat would prove tragic, Slaughter's superior, Confederate Maj. Gen. John G. Walker, rejected the ceasefire in a scathing exchange of letters with Wallace. Despite this, both sides honored a tacit agreement not to advance on the other without prior written notice.

A brigade of 1,900 Union troops commanded by Col. Robert B. Jones of the 34th Indiana Veteran Volunteer Infantry were on blockade duty at the Port of Brazos Santiago at the mouth of the present-day ship channel of the Port of Brownsville. The 400-man 34th Indiana was an experienced regiment that had served in the Vicksburg Campaign and was reorganized in December 1863 as a "Veteran" regiment, composed entirely of veterans from several other regiments whose original enlistments had expired. The 34th Indiana deployed to Los Brazos de Santiago on December 22, 1864, replacing the 91st Illinois Volunteer Infantry, which returned to New Orleans. The brigade also included the 87th and 62nd United States Colored Infantry Regiments ("United States Colored Troops", or U.S.C.T.) which had a combined strength of about 1,100. Shortly after Gen. Walker rejected the armistice proposal, Col. Jones resigned from the army to return to Indiana. He was replaced in the regiment by Lt. Col. Robert G. Morrison and at Los Brazos de Santiago by Colonel Theodore H. Barrett, commander of the 62nd U.S.C.T.

The 30-year-old Barrett had been an army officer since 1862, but he had yet to see combat. Anxious for higher rank, he volunteered for the newly raised "colored" regiments and was appointed in 1863 as colonel of the 1st Missouri Colored Infantry. In March 1864, the regiment became the 62nd U.S.C.T. Barrett contracted malaria in Louisiana that summer, and while he was on convalescent leave, the 62nd was posted to Brazos Santiago. He joined it there in February 1865.

Reasons for fighting

Historians still debate why this engagement at Palmito Ranch took place. Lee had surrendered to Grant in Appomattox Court House, Virginia, on April 9, triggering a series of formal surrenders in other places throughout the country. The Confederate and Union officers in Brownsville also knew that Lee had surrendered, effectively ending the war.

Soon after the battle, Barrett's detractors claimed he desired "a little battlefield glory before the war ended altogether." Others have suggested that Barrett needed horses for the 300 unmounted cavalrymen in his brigade and decided to take them from his enemy. Louis J. Schuler, in his 1960 pamphlet "The last battle in the War Between the States, May 13, 1865: Confederate Force of 300 defeats 1,700 Federals near Brownsville, Texas", asserts that Brig. Gen. Egbert B. Brown of the U.S. Volunteers had ordered the expedition to seize as contraband 2,000 bales of cotton stored in Brownsville and sell them for his own profit, but Brown was not even appointed to command at Brazos Santiago until later in May.

According to historian Jerry Thompson:
What was at stake was honor and money. With a stubborn reluctance to admit defeat, Ford asserted that the dignity and manhood of his men had to be defended.  Having previously proclaimed that he would never capitulate to "a mongrel force of Abolitionists, Negroes, plundering Mexicans, and perfidious renegades"...Ford was not about to surrender to invading black troops.... Even more important was the large quantity of Richard King and Mifflin Kenedy's cotton stacked in Brownsville waiting to be sent across the river to Matamoros. If Ford did not hold off the invading Federal force, the cotton would be confiscated by the Yankees and thousands of dollars lost."

Battle

Union Lieutenant Colonel David Branson wanted to attack the Confederate encampments commanded by Ford at White and Palmito ranches near Fort Brown outside Brownsville. Branson's Union forces consisted of 250 men of the 62nd U.S.C.T. in eight companies and two companies of the (U.S.) 2nd Texas Cavalry Battalion. The 300-man 2nd Texas, like the earlier-formed 1st Texas Cavalry Regiment, was composed largely of Texans of Mexican origin who remained loyal to the United States. They moved from Brazos Santiago to the mainland. At first Branson's expedition was successful, capturing three prisoners and some supplies, although it failed to achieve the desired surprise. During the afternoon, Confederate forces under Captain William N. Robinson counterattacked with less than 100 cavalry, driving Branson back to White's Ranch, where the fighting stopped for the night. Both sides sent for reinforcements; Ford arrived with six French guns and the remainder of his cavalry force (for a total of 300 men), while Barrett came with 200 troops of the 34th Indiana in nine under-strength companies.

The next day, Barrett started advancing westward, passing a half-mile to the west of Palmito Ranch, with skirmishers from the 34th Indiana deployed in advance. Ford attacked Barrett's force as it was skirmishing with an advance Confederate force along the Rio Grande about 4 p.m. He sent a couple of companies with artillery to attack the Union right flank and the remainder of his force into a frontal attack. After some confusion and fierce fighting, the Union forces retreated toward Boca Chica. Barrett attempted to form a rearguard, but Confederate artillery prevented him from rallying a force sufficient to do so. During the retreat, which lasted until 14 May, 50 members of the 34th Indiana's rearguard company, 30 stragglers, and 20 of the dismounted cavalry were surrounded in a bend of the Rio Grande and captured. The battle is recorded as a Confederate victory.

Fighting in the battle involved Caucasian, African-American, Hispanic, and Native American troops. Reports of shots from the Mexican side, the sounding of a warning to the Confederates of the Union approach, the crossing of Imperial cavalry into Texas, and the participation by several among Ford's troops are unverified, despite many witnesses reporting shooting from the Mexican shore.

In Barrett's official report of August 10, 1865, he reported 115 Union casualties: one killed, nine wounded, and 105 captured. Confederate casualties were reported as five or six wounded, with none killed. Historian and Ford biographer Stephen B. Oates, however, concludes that Union deaths were much higher, probably around 30, many of whom drowned in the Rio Grande or were attacked by French border guards on the Mexican side. He likewise estimated Confederate casualties at approximately the same number.

Using court-martial testimony and post returns from Brazos Santiago, historian Jerry D. Thompson of Texas A&M International University determined that:
 the 62nd U.S.C.T. incurred two killed and four wounded;
 the 34th Indiana had one killed, one wounded, and 79 captured; and
 the 2nd Texas Cavalry Battalion had one killed, seven wounded, and 22 captured,
 totaling four killed, 12 wounded, and 101 captured.

Private John J. Williams of the 34th Indiana was the last fatality during the Battle at Palmito Ranch, likely making him the final combat death of the entire war.

Aftermath
President Jefferson Davis was captured and imprisoned on May 10, 1865, marking the effective end of the Confederate government. In addition, that day United States President Andrew Johnson declared "armed resistance ...virtually at an end." Historian James McPherson joins other historians in concluding that the war ended when the government ended.

Confederate General Edmund Kirby Smith officially surrendered all Confederate forces in the Trans-Mississippi Department on June 2, 1865, except those under the command of Brigadier General Chief Stand Watie in the Indian Territory. Stand Watie, of the 1st Cherokee Mounted Rifles, on June 23, 1865, became the last Confederate general to surrender his forces, in Doaksville, Indian Territory. On that same day, United States President Andrew Johnson ended the Union blockade of the Southern states.

Many senior Confederate commanders in Texas (including Smith, Walker, Slaughter, and Ford) and many troops with their equipment fled across the border to Mexico. Wanting to resist capture, they may also have intended to ally with French Imperial forces, or with Mexican forces under deposed President Benito Juárez.

The Military Division of the Southwest (after June 27 the Division of the Gulf), commanded by Maj. Gen. Phillip H. Sheridan, occupied Texas between June and August. Consisting of the IV Corps, XIII Corps, the African-American XXV Corps, and two 4,000-man cavalry divisions commanded by Brig. Gen. Wesley Merritt and Maj. Gen. George A. Custer, it aggregated a 50,000-man force on the Gulf Coast and along the Rio Grande to pressure the French intervention in Mexico and garrison the Reconstruction Department of Texas.

In July 1865, Barrett proffered charges of disobedience of orders, neglect of duty, abandoning his colors, and conduct prejudicial to good order and military discipline against Morrison for actions in the battle, resulting in the latter's court martial. Confederate Col. Ford, who had returned from Mexico at the request of Union Gen. Frederick Steele to act as parole commissioner for disbanding Confederate forces, appeared as a defense witness and assisted in absolving Morrison of responsibility for the defeat at Palmito Ranch.

The history of this engagement provides accounts of the roles of Hispanic Confederate veterans and of the treatment by Confederates in South Texas of black prisoners-of-war. Hispanic Confederates served at Fort Brown in Brownsville and on the field of Palmito Ranch. Col. Santos Benavides, who was the highest-ranking Hispanic in either army, led between 100 and 150 Hispanic soldiers in the Brownsville Campaign in May 1865.

When Colonel Ford surrendered his command following the campaign of Palmito Ranch, he urged his men to honor their paroles. He insisted that "The negro had a right to vote."

"Last battle of the Civil War"

Although officially most historians say this was the last land action fought between the North and the South, some sources suggest that the battle on May 19, 1865, of Hobdy's Bridge, located near Eufaula, Alabama, was the last skirmish between the two forces. Union records show that the last Northern soldier killed in combat during the war was Corporal John W. Skinner in this action. Three others were wounded, also from the same unit, Company C, 1st Florida U.S. Cavalry.

Historian Richard Gardiner stated in 2013 that on May 10, 1865:
A confrontation took place at Palmetto Ranch. There was no Confederacy in existence when the "battle" occurred. The ex-Confederates at Palmetto Ranch were aware that Lee had surrendered and that the war was over. What happened in Texas can only be understood as a "post-war" encounter between Federals and ex-Confederate "outlaws."

The Confederates won this engagement, but as there was no organized command structure, there has been controversy about the Union casualties. In 1896 these same men had their pensions cut, although this was quickly rectified by an appeal to the commissioner of pensions. The assistant secretary to the commissioner overturned the pension cut, legally ruling the men as the last Union casualties of the war.

On April 2, 1866, President Johnson declared the insurrection at an end, except in Texas. There a technicality concerning incomplete formation of a new state government prevented declaring the insurrection over. Johnson declared the insurrection at an end in Texas and throughout the United States on August 20, 1866.

Battlefield

The area has remained relatively unchanged, with the marshy, windswept prairies almost the same as they were in 1865. The area is indicated by a large highway marker telling the history of the engagement, installed on the "Boca Chica Highway" (Texas State Highway 4) near where Palmito Ranch originally stood. The Civil War Trust (a division of the American Battlefield Trust) and its partners have acquired and preserved  of the battlefield.

See also

List of National Historic Landmarks in Texas
National Register of Historic Places listings in Cameron County, Texas

Notes

References

 Theodore Barrett's and David Branson's Official Battle Reports, pp. 265–269, Digital Library, Cornell University
 Bailey, Anne, J. Trans-Mississippi Department.  p. 1100
 Benedict, H. Y. Texas In The Encyclopedia Americana.  New York: The Encyclopedia Americana Corporation, 1920 
 Blair, Jayne E. The Essential Civil War: A Handbook to the Battles, Armies, Navies and Commanders. Jefferson, NC and London: McFarland & Company, Inc., 2006. 
 Catton, Bruce. The Centennial History of the Civil War. Vol. 3, Never Call Retreat. Garden City, NY: Doubleday, 1965. 
 Comtois, Pierre. "War's Last Battle." America's Civil War, July 1992 (Vol. 5, No. 2)
 Conyer, Luther. Last Battle of the War. From the Dallas, Texas News, December 1896. In Brock, R. A. Southern Historical Society Papers. Volume XXIV. Richmond: Published by the Society, 1896 
 Civil War Trust web site. Retrieved January 20, 2014
 Civil War Preservation Trust. Campi, James, ed. and Mary Goundrey, Wendy Valentine. Civil War Sites: The Official Guide to the Civil War Discovery Trail, 2d ed. Guilford, CT: The Globe Pequot Press, 2008. . First edition published 2003
 Delaney, Norman C. Palmito Ranch, Tex., eng. at. May 12–13, 1865.  p. 556. In Historical Times Illustrated History of the Civil War, edited by Patricia L. Faust. New York: Harper & Row, 1986. 
 Eicher, David J. The Longest Night: A Military History of the Civil War. New York: Simon & Schuster, 2001. . Retrieved January 20, 2014
 
 Forgie, George B. Brownsville, Texas: City of Brownsville In Current, Richard N. ed. The Confederacy: Selections from the Four-Volume Macmillan Encyclopedia of the Confederacy New York: Simon & Schuster Macmillan, 1993, introductory material, 1998. .  p. 173
 Frazier, Donald S. Brownsville, Texas: Battles of Brownsville.  p. 173
 Foote, Shelby. The Civil War: A Narrative. Vol. 3, Red River to Appomattox. New York: Random House, 1974. 
 Gillett, Mary C. (US Army). The Army Medical Department, 1818–1865. Washington, DC: Center of Military History, U.S. Army, 1987  Retrieved January 18, 2014
 Glatthaar, Joseph T. The American Civil War: The War in the West 1863 – May 1865. Taylor & Francis, 2003. . First published: Oxford: Osprey, 2001. . Retrieved January 20, 2014
 Greeley, Horace. The American conflict: a history of the great rebellion in the United States of America. Volume II. Hartford: O.D. Case and Company, 1867. . Retrieved April 9, 2011. 
 Hendrickson, Robert. The Road to Appomattox. New York: John Wiley & Sons, Inc. 2000. , p. 221.
 Hunt, Jeffrey Wm. The Last Battle of the Civil War: Palmetto Ranch. Austin, TX: University of Texas Press, 2000. , a scholarly history
 Hunt, Jeffrey Wm. Palmito Ranch, Battle of Handbook of Texas Online (1999)
 Jones, Terry L. Historical Dictionary of the Civil War, Volume 1. Lanham, MD: Scarecrow Press, 2011. . Retrieved January 20, 2014
 Keegan, John. The American Civil War: A Military History. New York: Alfred A. Knopf, a division of Random House, 2009. 
 Kennedy, Frances H., ed. The Civil War Battlefield Guide. 2nd ed. Boston: Houghton Mifflin Co., 1998. 
 Kurtz, Henry I. "Last Battle of the War." Civil War Times Illustrated, April 1962 (Vol. I, No. 1)
 Long, E. B. The Civil War Day by Day: An Almanac, 1861–1865. Garden City, NY: Doubleday, 1971   Page numbers are from 1971 print edition; web address is for 2012 reprint.
 Lossing, Benson John and William Barritt. Pictorial history of the civil war in the United States of America, Volume 3  Hartford: Thomas Belknap, 1877.  Retrieved May 1, 2011.
 Martin, ed., John H. Columbus, Geo., from Its Selection as a "trading Town" in 1827, to Its Partial Destruction by Wilson's Raid in 1865.. Columbus, GA: Gilbert, Book Printer and Binder, 1874.  p. 178
 Marvel, William. Battle of Palmetto Ranch: American Civil War's Final Battle. Originally published by Civil War Times magazine as "Last Hurrah at Palmetto Ranch", January 2006 (Vol. XLIV, No. 6). Published Online: June 12, 2006. Retrieved from Historynet.com on January 20, 2014
 Pollard, Edward A. The Lost Cause; A New Southern History of the War of the Confederates. New York: E. B. Treat & Co. 1867 
 Studies in History, Economics, and Public Law, Volume 36. New York: Columbia University Press, 1910, p. 26 
 Swanson, Mark. Atlas of the Civil War, Month by Month: Major Battles and Troop Movements. Athens, GA: University of Georgia Press, 2004. . Retrieved January 17, 2014
 Tucker, Phillip Thomas. The Final Fury: Palmito Ranch, The Last Battle of the Civil War (2001), a scholarly history 
 Tucker, Spencer C., ed. Almanac of American Military History, Volume 1. Santa Barbara, CA: ABC-CLIO, 2012. . Retrieved January 20, 2014
 Trudeau, Noah Andre. Like Men of War: Black Troops in the Civil War 1862–1865. Edison, NJ: Castle Books, 2002. . Originally published: New York: Little, Brown and Company, 1998
 Trudeau, Noah Andre. Out of the Storm: The End of the Civil War, April – June 1865. Boston: Little, Brown & Company, 1994. 
 "Battle of Palmito Ranch", U.S. National Park Service; CWSAC Battle Summaries. Retrieved January 20, 2014
 Wagner, Margaret E., Gary W. Gallagher,Hayden L Gomez, and Paul Dicklemen. The Library of Congress Civil War Desk Reference. New York: Simon & Schuster Paperbacks, Inc., 2009 edition. . First Published 2002. pp. 328–330
 Ward, Geoffrey C. and Kenneth Burns. The Civil War. New York: Knopf, 1990, p. 317. . Retrieved January 17, 2014
 Wertz, Jay and Edwin C. Bearss. Smithsonian's Great Battles and Battlefields of the Civil War. New York: William Morrow & Co., 1997.

External links

 A PDF of Fish and Wildlife Service Information on the Park and Battle
 PDF on Texas Historic Civil War Battlefields

Conflicts in 1865
Palmito Ranch
Palmito Ranch
Palmito Ranch
Cameron County, Texas
1865 in the American Civil War
1865 in Texas
May 1865 events
National Historic Landmarks in Texas
Battlefields of the Trans-Mississippi Theater of the American Civil War
Protected areas of Cameron County, Texas
Conflict sites on the National Register of Historic Places in Texas
Texas in the American Civil War
National Register of Historic Places in Cameron County, Texas
American Civil War on the National Register of Historic Places